Vaulovo is a rural locality (a selo) in Razdolyevskoye Rural Settlement, Kolchuginsky District, Vladimir Oblast, Russia. The population was 139 as of 2010. There are 5 streets.

Geography 
Vaulovo is located on the Volga River, 33 km south of Kolchugino (the district's administrative centre) by road. Konyshevo is the nearest rural locality.

References 

Rural localities in Kolchuginsky District
Pokrovsky Uyezd